Amara browni is a species of beetle of the genus Amara in the family Carabidae.

References

browni
Beetles described in 1968